Tolidostena montana is a beetle in the genus Tolidostena of the family Mordellidae. It was described in 1991 by Kiyoyama.

References

Mordellidae
Beetles described in 1991